The Association of British Lourdes Pilgrimage Hospitalités (ABLPH) was founded in 1985/86 as a forum for the many groups involved in organising pilgrimages to the shrine of Lourdes. The main role of the association is to allow members to share / discuss good practice, experiences and fellowship, as well as providing a focal point for spreading news and information from the various shrine authorities.

Members formally meet once a year (typically a weekend in February) to discuss issues of mutual concern, to encourage communication, and to meet with representatives of the Sanctuaries and the Hospitalité Notre Dame de Lourdes. This meeting includes workshops, and discussions relating to issues that affect Lourdes pilgrims as well as the Annual General Meeting of the Association.

Membership
Membership of the association is open to pilgrimage hospitalités from across England, Scotland and Wales, either diocesan in nature or representative of other pilgrimage bodies, as well as representatives of other groups who regularly undertake pilgrimages to Lourdes from Britain.

Association members include...
Catholic Association Pilgrimage
Liverpool hospitalité
Diocese of Shrewsbury Lourdes Hospitalité
HCPT – The Pilgrimage Trust
Salford Hospitality of Our Lady of Lourdes
Archdiocese of St Andrews & Edinburgh - Hospitalité
Diocese of Westminster

See also
Lourdes
Hospitalité Notre Dame de Lourdes
Pilgrimages

References

External links
 Further information on the ABLPH
 ABLPH Constitution
 Catholic Association UK

Hospitalités of Lourdes
Catholic Church in the United Kingdom
Catholic Church in England and Wales
1980s establishments in the United Kingdom
Organizations established in the 1980s